Nineteen Old Poems, also known as Ku-shih shih-chiu shou is an anthology of Chinese poems, consisting of nineteen poems which were probably originally collected during the Han Dynasty. These nineteen poems were very influential on later poetry, in part because of their use of the five-character line. The dating of the original poems is uncertain, though in their present form they can be traced back to about 520 CE, when these poems were included in the famous literary anthology Wen Xuan, a compilation of literature attributed to the Liang Crown Prince Xiao Tong. The Nineteen Old Poems have been supposed to date mainly from the second century CE. The gushi, or old style, poetry developed as an important poetic form of Classical Chinese poetry, in subsequent eras. The authorship of the "Nineteen Old Poems" is anonymous, however there are indications as to the authorship in terms of class and educational status, such as the focus on "the carriages and fine clothing, the mansions and entertainments of the upper classes", together with the literary references to the Shijing. One of the tendencies of these poems is towards a "tone of brooding melancholy."

-- Burton Watson, describing the Nineteen Old Poems, as quoted in his book Chinese Lyricism.<ref>Watson, 32.</p></ref>

See also
Classical Chinese poetry
Gushi (poetry)
Han poetry
Wen Xuan

Notes

References
Birrell, Anne (1988). Popular Songs and Ballads of Han China. (London: Unwin Hyman). 
Watson, Burton (1971). CHINESE LYRICISM: Shih Poetry from the Second to the Twelfth Century. New York: Columbia University Press. 
 Yip, Wai-lim  (1997). Chinese Poetry: An Anthology of Major Modes and Genres . Durham and London: Duke University Press.

External links
 

Han dynasty texts
Han dynasty poetry
Chinese poetry anthologies